Love Da Records is an international record label founded in 1998. The label is one of the largest indie music distributors in South East Asia, distributing over 150 individual labels covering music of different genres. With its headquarters in Hong Kong, Love Da Records also extended its branches to Taiwan, Singapore and Malaysia.

Record labels represented by Love Da Records include Beggars Group, 4AD, XL Recordings, Rough Trade Records, Warp Records, Ninja Tune, V2 Records, PIAS, Wall of Sound, !K7, Kitsuné Music, Ministry of Sound, Hed Kandi and more.

Among its most famous artists under the company’s representing labels are the Radiohead, The Prodigy, Nouvelle Vague, Tiësto, Vampire Weekend, Brett Anderson, Carla Bruni, Bloc Party, Grace Jones, Crystal Castles, Travis and Phoenix.

As an event promoter, Love Da Records has also organised concerts with Nouvelle Vague, Suzanne Vega and Télépopmusik, as well as the Kitsuné Club Nights series, bringing "quality music to the people".

Labels

 4AD
 Azuli Records
 BBE
 Beggars Group 
 Bella Union
 Café del Mar
 Chall'o Music
 Chemikal Underground
 Cooking Vinyl
 Cooperative Music
 Defected Records
 Different Records
 Discograph Records
 Ever Records
 Fabric Discography
 Fat Cat Records
 Fierce Angel
 George V
 Get Physical Music
 Global Underground
 Hed Kandi
 Intergroove
 !K7
 Kitsuné Music
 Koch Records
 Last Gang Records
 Matador Records
 Memphis Industries 
 Ministry of Sound 
 Naïve Records
 Ninja Tune
 One Little Indian Records
 Peacefrog Records
 PIAS
 Pschent Music
 Rapster Records
 Rough Trade Records
 Seamless Records
 Secretly Canadian
 Soma Records
 Sonar Kollektiv
 Southern Fried Records
 Stefano Cecchi Records
 Strictly Rhythm
 Strut Records
 The Perfect Kiss Records
 Too Pure
 Touch and Go Records
 Tru Thoughts
 United Recordings
 Union Square Music
 V2 Records
 Wagram Music
 Wall of Sound
 Warp Records
 Wichita Recordings
 Wiiija
 XL Recordings
 Ya Basta Records

References

External links
 

British record labels
Record label distributors
Record labels established in 1998
IFPI members